Voka is a village in Toila Parish, Ida-Viru County, Estonia.

References

Villages in Ida-Viru County